Inape parastella is a species of moth of the family Tortricidae. It is found in Ecuador (Carchi Province).

The ground colour of the forewings is cream with some whiter parts and brownish suffusions. The hindwings are brownish with darker strigulation.

Etymology
The species name refers to the similarity with Inape stella plus the Latin adjective para (meaning similar).

References

Moths described in 2009
Endemic fauna of Ecuador
Moths of South America
parastella
Taxa named by Józef Razowski